Vaudricourt is a commune in the Pas-de-Calais department in the Hauts-de-France region of France.

Geography

Population

Places of interest
 The church of Notre-Dame, dating from the thirteenth century.
 The nineteenth-century chateau.
 A war memorial.

See also
Communes of the Pas-de-Calais department

References

Communes of Pas-de-Calais